The 32nd running of the Tour of Flanders cycling classic was held on Sunday, 18 April 1948. Belgian Briek Schotte won the race in a four-man sprint. It was Schotte's second win in the Tour of Flanders, after 1942. 265 riders, of which 50 non-Belgians, started the race, an all-time record. 85 of them finished.

Route
The race started in Ghent and finished in Wetteren – totaling 257 km. The course featured three categorized climbs:

Results

References

Tour of Flanders
1948 in road cycling
1948 in Belgian sport
Tour of Flanders